Remote Control the seventh volume of the Television's Greatest Hits series of compilation albums by TVT Records. The album catalog was later acquired by The Bicycle Music Company. In September 2011, Los Angeles-based Oglio Records announced they were releasing the  Television's Greatest Hits song catalog after entering into an arrangement The Bicycle Music Company. A series of 9 initial "6-packs" including some of the songs from the album has been announced for 2011.

Track listing 
A1 Fish
A2 Night Court
A3 What's Happening!!
A4 Diff'rent Strokes ("It Takes Diff'rent Strokes")
A5 Mr. Belvedere ("According To Our New Arrivals")
A6 Growing Pains ("As Long As We Got Each Other")
A7 Charles in Charge
A8 Silver Spoons ("Together")
A9 Webster ("Then Came You")
A10 Too Close For Comfort
A11 Who's the Boss? ("Brand New Life")
A12 Perfect Strangers ("Nothing's Gonna Stop Me Now")
A13 Alice ("There's a New Girl In Town")
A14 It's a Living
A15 Angie
A16 227 ("There's No Place Like Home")
A17 The Golden Girls ("Thank You For Being a Friend")
B1 ALF
B2 Mork & Mindy
B3 Police Squad!
B4 Family Ties ("Without Us")
B5 Moonlighting
B6 Soap
B7 Benson
B8 The Benny Hill Show ("Yakety Sax")
B9 The Young Ones
B10 The People's Court ("The Big One")
B11 Family Feud ("The Feud")
B12 The Price Is Right
B13 Siskel and Ebert
B14 Monday Night Football ("Superstar" (AKA "Heavy Action"))
B15 Lifestyles of the Rich and Famous ("Come With Me Now")
B16 Fame
B17 The Paper Chase
B18 Fantasy Island
C1 Falcon Crest
C2 The Colbys
C3 Highway to Heaven
C4 The Dukes of Hazzard ("Good Ol' Boys")
C5 B. J. and the Bear
C6 Movin' On
C7 The Fall Guy ("The Unknown Stuntman")
C8 James at 15 ("It's All Up To You")
C9 Eight Is Enough
C10 Baa Baa Black Sheep
C11 Trapper John, M.D.
C12 CHiPs
C13 Vega$
C14 Matt Houston
D1 Cagney & Lacey
D2 T. J. Hooker
D3 Hardcastle and McCormick ("Drive")
D4 Hunter
D5 MacGyver
D6 Knight Rider
D7 Airwolf
D8 The Incredible Hulk
D9 V: The Series
D10 The New Twilight Zone
D11 Doctor Who
D12 Mystery!
D13 The Hardy Boys/Nancy Drew Mysteries
D14 Roots
D15 Vietnam: A Television History
D16 Cosmos: A Personal Voyage ("Heaven and Hell")

References

External links
Television's Greatest Hits at Oglio Records

1996 compilation albums
TVT Records compilation albums
Television's Greatest Hits albums